Commune, Bamako may refer to various communes in Bamako, Mali such as:

Commune I, Bamako
Commune II, Bamako
Commune III, Bamako
Commune IV, Bamako
Commune V, Bamako
Commune VI, Bamako